Yahudi, is a 1958 Hindi-language epic romantic historical drama film directed by Bimal Roy.  It starred Dilip Kumar, Meena Kumari, Sohrab Modi, Nazir Hussain, Nigar Sultana and others. It was based on the play Yahudi Ki Ladki by Agha Hashar Kashmiri, a classic in Parsi-Urdu theatre, about persecution of Jews in the Roman Empire. Although, not very well received critically, the film was a big hit despite its alien theme, and was the third-highest grossing Indian film of 1958, owing to the box office draw of Dilip Kumar.

The film's lyricist Shailendra won the Filmfare Award for Best Lyricist at the 6th ceremony, for the song "Yeh Mera Diwanapan Hai", sung by Mukesh.

The plot bears similarities to Jacques Fromental Halévy's opera La Juive.

The story revolves around the life of a foster relationship. Set in the era of the Roman Empire over 2000 years ago, it focuses upon the persecution of Jews at that time in the empire's centre - Rome.

Plot

Ezra (Sohrab Modi) is a jeweller who has a son called Elijah. He also has a friendly butler/childminder called Emmanuel. In the beginning, Ezra is due to leave. As he does, Elijah becomes upset and stands at the balcony. In the roads of the Jewish area, Brutus (Nazir Hussain), Governor of Rome, is passing, making an announcement. Watching over the balcony is Elijah. A stone slips from his hand and hits Brutus on the head. Brutus immediately gets Elijah arrested, and as Elijah is a Jew, sentences him to death. Hearing this, Ezra rapidly returns from his trip and arrives at the doorstep of Brutus. He begs Brutus to free Elijah, but Brutus feeds Elijah to hungry lions. Ezra sadly returns to his house. In revenge, Emmanuel kidnaps Lydia, motherless daughter of Brutus, and takes her to Ezra. Ezra refuses to kill Lydia and instead adopts the child.

Brutus' anger brews. He orders the guards to find his daughter, and call for punishment of all Jews. Ezra remains hidden and raises Lydia, who grows up thinking she is Ezra's daughter and that her name is Hannah.

Years pass and Ezra grows to become a successful jeweller, well known to be so good and a Jew. Hannah (Meena Kumari) grows into a beautiful young lady and attracts attention from many. The Emperor of Rome arrives in Rome for the marriage of his son Prince Marcus (Dilip Kumar) to Brutus' niece Princess Octivia (Nigar Sultana).

However, Prince Marcus avoids talking about his marriage and opposes it. One day, when returning from a hunting trip, he gets hurt and is cared for by Hannah. He then disguises himself as a Jew and goes back into the Jewish area. He rescues Hannah from the unwanted attentions of a Roman soldier and meets her father, Ezra, not as Prince Marcus but as Monshija, a successful Jew from Alexandria. Ezra is happy to meet him and "Monshija" and Hannah fall in love.

But Hannah soon notices that something isn't right. Prince Marcus then reveals who he is, making Hannah very upset at his dishonesty, and she banishes the Prince from her life.

Then comes the day of the marriage of Prince Marcus and Princess Octivia. Everyone is invited. Before the ritual could commence, Hannah shouts aloud that she had been cheated by a Roman. Ezra joins in to get back at his enemy Brutus. He clamors for justice. The Emperor demands the name of the culprit and Hannah claims it was Prince Marcus. Brutus tries to rebut Hannah and Ezra, but the Emperor insists that justice must be done. Heartbroken, Hannah returns home.

She is followed by Princess Octivia. Hannah sees the Princess at her doorstep and denies her entry. Hannah knew the princess would beg for the Prince's life. However, the princess told Hannah that the Prince will be sentenced to death the very next day. Early morning the next day, without warning, Hannah took Ezra with her to the Emperor. There she told him that she takes the accusation back. She tells the Emperor that the man that cheated was not the prince but a look-alike. Ezra is shocked, and Brutus, filled with happiness, sentences Hannah and Ezra to death. They are to be thrown into a cauldron of boiling oil that very day, in front of the Prince. Unable to bear that his love will be burnt in front of him, Prince Marcus blinds himself, then goes to the cauldron chamber.

Here Ezra is begging for Hannah's life, and Hannah is trying to reason with Ezra that she'd rather die than live a life of hate. But Brutus stops at nothing and wants the two to die. Immediately, Ezra tells Brutus that he knows where the Governor's lost daughter is. Brutus is confused and says that this is Ezra's revenge and accuses the Jew of lying. Ezra sarcastically agrees. But Brutus begs Ezra and Ezra will only tell on one condition. That Hannah is thrown into the cauldron as soon as Brutus finds out who his daughter is. Now Hannah is confused. Ezra tells Brutus that Hannah is Brutus' daughter and the Jew tells the guards to throw Hannah into the boiling oil. Brutus orders them to stop. Ezra looks at Hannah and dies. Hannah cries over her foster father's dead body. Brutus tells Hannah not to cry, but Hannah does not listen. She runs away from Brutus and finds the Prince. Shocked to find him blind, Hannah lends him support and helps him as the two disappear into the distance.

Cast
Sohrab Modi as Ezra Johari
Dilip Kumar as Shehzada Marcus
Meena Kumari as Hannah / Lydia
Nigar Sultana as Shehzadi Octavia
Nazir Hussain as Brutus
Anwar Hussain as Antonio
Minu Mumtaz as Ruth
Tiwari as Emmanuel
Murad as Emperor Julius Caesar
Indira as Yasmine
Adil
Bikram kapoor as Leo
Baby Naaz as Young Lydia 
Romi as Elijah 
Helen as Dancer / Singer
Cuckoo as Dancer / Singer
Kamala Laxman as Wedding Dancer / Singer

Soundtrack

References

External links
 
 Full movie YouTube

1950s Hindi-language films
1958 films
Films scored by Shankar–Jaikishan
Films directed by Bimal Roy
Films set in the Roman Empire
Indian historical drama films
Films about royalty
Films about antisemitism
Indian films based on plays
Indian epic films
Historical epic films
1950s historical drama films
1958 drama films